An iron man is an athlete of unusual physical endurance. This durability is generally measured by an athlete's ability to play without missing a game for an extended period of time, sometimes even for an entire career. Some of the more notable athletes with significant streaks in sports history include baseball's Lou Gehrig and Cal Ripken Jr.,  American football's Brett Favre and Joe Thomas, basketball's A. C. Green, stock car racing's Jeff Gordon and hockey's Phil Kessel & Keith Yandle.

Background
The term "iron man" as it pertains to sports longevity has origins in Major League Baseball pitcher Joe McGinnity, who was known for pitching in back-to-back doubleheaders and leading his league in innings pitched four times in five seasons from 1900 to 1904. He also played professionally until age 54. His nickname was "Iron Man", although he said the name originated from his off-season work at his family's foundry business.

In 1939, an athlete noted for endurance was recognized as an "iron man" by the Boston Post when Lou Gehrig's streak of 2,130 consecutive games ended when he asked his manager to take him out of the lineup because of his fading abilities. Gehrig had been a consistent performer on the field, attaining a yearly batting average of at least .300 throughout his career until the previous season, when he fell to .295. 

A common characteristic of an iron man is the ability to play through injury. Gehrig displayed this trait in 1934 when his streak was in jeopardy of being snapped at 1,426 games. He was injured during a game and was pulled from the lineup. The next day, after receiving heat treatments and massages for a stiff back, he was able to get a hit before leaving the contest. Gehrig's record stood for 56 years until surpassed by Cal Ripken Jr. in 1995. After Ripken's record-breaking streak garnered attention from the media, the NBA's A.C. Green received attention, in 1997, for his streak of consecutive games played, as he was approaching Randy Smith's record. In 1999, Brett Favre set the record for consecutive starts by a quarterback when he started his 117th consecutive game, surpassing the mark established by Ron Jaworski. In 2009, Favre would surpass Jim Marshall's starts streak at any position with his 271st consecutive start.

An iron man streak can also end for disciplinary reasons. In 2015, Matt Kenseth was suspended after he caused a crash that ended Joey Logano's race. NASCAR issued a two-race suspension, effectively ending his streak at 571, leaving him ineligible for pursuing Jeff Gordon's 797-race streak.

In international cricket, players can be taken out of the squad for injuries, discipline, poor form, illegal bowling action, or unfavourable conditions for certain bowlers, or simply as a healthy break when they are rested during long tours or in a calendar year with hectic schedules. In 2016, Brendon McCullum finished his international career having started in 101 consecutive tests from debut; this is notable not only because he was never dropped for poor form or poor health, but because New Zealand has a far leaner schedule than Australia and England; even though he is nowhere near Allan Border's actual record of 153, they were not from debut. Brendon McCullum also started 122 consecutive One-Day Internationals from 2004–2010, the same as Mahela Jayawardene of Sri Lanka with 122 each, but the record is held by Sachin Tendulkar whose streak was snapped by an injury.

In the National Football League, Tom Brady of the Tampa Bay Buccaneers and Jake Matthews of the Atlanta Falcons have the longest active streak among quarterbacks and among all players, respectively.

Iron man leaderboard

See also

Major League Baseball consecutive games played streaks
List of most consecutive starts and games played by National Football League players
List of NHL players with 500 consecutive games played

Notes

References

Sports terminology